Joseph Mark Jacobson (born 17 November 1986) is a Welsh professional footballer who plays as a left back and centre back for League One side Wycombe Wanderers. 

He is the former captain of the Wales U21 team, and is also a former captain of the Cardiff City reserve team. He was selected in League Two's PFA Team of the Year in 2016 and League One's in 2020.

Early and personal life
Jacobson was born and grew up in Llanishen, Cardiff, Wales, and is Jewish. He has a brother, Sam. His family attends the Cardiff United Synagogue.

Club career

Cardiff City
Jacobson signed professional terms with his hometown club in July 2006. He made his league debut as a substitute for Chris Barker in Cardiff's Championship defeat at home to Norwich City on 22 April 2006. He made his first start on 22 August in Cardiff's surprise defeat at home to League Two side Barnet in the Football League Cup, and was voted Man of The Match by the local press.

In November 2006 the Torquay-based newspaper the Herald Express reported that Jacobson was likely to sign for Torquay United on loan, a story backed up by the team's official website. However, the move fell through when Torquay failed to loan Martin Phillips to Exeter City and Torquay chairman Chris Roberts refused to sanction the deal. He joined Accrington Stanley on loan and started their Football League Two match away at Grimsby on 25 November, followed by a Football League Trophy quarter-final tie away at League One club Doncaster Rovers on the following Tuesday.

Bristol Rovers
In February 2007, Jacobson joined Bristol Rovers on loan until the end of the season, and then signed on a permanent basis in the summer of 2007.

Jacobson was the subject of controversy after executing a tackle on Kieron Dyer during a second round League Cup match against West Ham United on 28 August 2007. The tackle broke Dyer's tibia and fibula bones in his right leg, rendering him unavailable for both domestic and international selection. West Ham's manager Alan Curbishley, was furious initially accusing Jacobson of conducting himself maliciously, however this was dismissed with a written apology to Jacobson when Curbishley saw the tackle again.
Awarded Bristol Rovers Supporters Club Young Player of the Year Award 2007–08.
During his spell at Rovers, he was voted Young Player of the Year and helped the team to promotion to League 1 and to the quarter final of the FA Cup, scoring in a penalty shoot out win against Premiership Fulham. In 2008, he won the Maccabi GB Senior Sports Award.

On 8 May 2009, it was announced that Jacobson was to be released by Bristol Rovers at the end of his contract.

Oldham Athletic
On 18 June 2009, Jacobson signed a two-year contract with Oldham Athletic after passing a medical. Jacobson made his long-awaited debut for Oldham on 24 November 2009, playing 45 minutes as a substitute in a 3:nil defeat to Walsall.

In July 2010 he was transfer-listed by the club, along with five other first team players.

Accrington Stanley

On 23 November, he joined Accrington Stanley on loan. On 7 January Stanley announced the loan had been extended until 29 January with an option to extend until the end of the season. The following day he scored his first goal for the club as they beat Bury 1–0. On 31 January 2011 he signed for Stanley on a permanent basis, helping them to achieve a playoff place.

Shrewsbury Town
Following the expiration of his Accrington contract, on 28 June 2011 it was announced that he would join Shrewsbury Town on a two-year deal. In an interview he told reporters: "it's the place I wanted to be." Joe made his first appearance for Shrewsbury Town in a 2–0 home win against Crewe Alexandra
 and scored his first goal as a Shrewsbury player in a 7–2 away win against Northampton Town. In the 2011–12 season he made 45 appearances for Shrewsbury Town in all competitions establishing himself as first-choice left-back with manager Graham Turner. In the 2012–13 season, he was selected as captain in the absence of Matt Richards as Shrewsbury confirmed their League One status in a 0–0 draw away at Colchester United on 20 April 2013. He retained this role for the final two matches of the season, also scoring in both, against Oldham Athletic and Portsmouth.

By playing an undisclosed number of matches for Shrewsbury Town, Jacobson triggered a clause in his contract to earn another year, extending his stay to the end of the 2013–14 season. Following Shrewsbury's relegation, Jacobson was released at the end of his contract.

Wycombe Wanderers
On 1 July 2014, Jacobson signed a two-year contract with Wycombe Wanderers following his release from Shrewsbury Town. He scored his first career hat-trick with a free kick and two direct corners in a 3–1 win over Lincoln City. In 2016 he was selected in League Two's PFA Team of the Year. In November 2019 he received the League One Player of the Month Award. In July 2020 Jacobson was in discussions about extending his contract with Wycombe. Jacobson was awarded the 'Players' Player' award in May 2021, voted for by the playing squad. During the 2022 season, Jacobson has been the captain for the Wanderers. Having been defeated 2–0 by Sunderland in the 2022 EFL League One play-off Final, Jacobson was offered a new contract at the end of the 2021–22 season.

International career
Jacobson represented Great Britain at the 2001 Maccabiah Games in Israel at the age of 14.

Jacobson captained the Wales Under-21 side that beat France and Romania until narrowly losing over two legs to England U21 in the 2009 European Championship play-offs in October 2008. John Toshack named him in the senior squad for several friendlies but he is yet to make his debut for the senior team.

Career statistics

Honours
Shrewsbury Town
League Two runner-up: 2011–12

Wycombe Wanderers
League One play-offs: 2020
League Two promotion: 2017–18

Individual
PFA Team of the Year: 2015–16 League Two, 2019–20 League One
Wycombe Wanderers Player of the Season: 2019–20
Wycombe Wanderers Player's Player of the Season: 2020–21

See also
List of select Jewish football (association; soccer) players

References

External links

1986 births
Living people
Footballers from Cardiff
Welsh footballers
Wales youth international footballers
Wales under-21 international footballers
Association football defenders
Cardiff City F.C. players
Accrington Stanley F.C. players
Bristol Rovers F.C. players
Oldham Athletic A.F.C. players
Shrewsbury Town F.C. players
Wycombe Wanderers F.C. players
English Football League players
Maccabiah Games competitors for Great Britain
Maccabiah Games footballers
Competitors at the 2001 Maccabiah Games
Jewish footballers
Welsh Jews